The VNU University of Engineering and Technology is a member of Vietnam National University of Hanoi (VNU). Established in 2004 from the Faculty of Technology, it has grown over the years into one of the best schools in Vietnam for computer science major.

Academics

Faculty and School

 Faculty of Information Technology
 Faculty of Electronics and Telecommunications
 Faculty of Engineering Physics and Nanotechnology
 Faculty of Mechatronics and Automation
 School of Aerospace Engineering
 Faculty of Agricultural Technology
 Department of Engineering and Technology in Construction and Transportation

Research Institutes, Key Labs, and Centers

 Advanced Institute of Engineering and Technology (AVITECH)
 Laboratory on Smart Integrated Systems (SISLAB)
 Laboratory for Micro-Nano Technology (Micro-Nano Lab)
 Center of Electronics and Telecommunications
 Center of Multidisciplinary Integrated Technologies for Field Monitoring (FIMO)

References 

Educational institutions established in 2004
Engineering universities and colleges in Vietnam
Universities in Hanoi
Vietnam National University, Hanoi
2004 establishments in Vietnam